Juin may refer to:

Juin is the month of June in French
Alphonse Juin (1888–1967), Marshal of France

See also
Boulevard du 30 Juin, a major street in Kinshasa, Democratic Republic of the Congo
Juine, a 53-kilometre-long French river